A caretaker government is a temporary ad hoc government that performs some governmental duties and functions in a country until a regular government is elected or formed. Depending on specific practice, it usually consists of either randomly selected or approved members of parliament or outgoing members until their dismissal.

Caretaker governments in representative democracies are usually limited in their function, serving only to maintain the status quo, rather than truly govern and propose new legislation. Unlike the government it is meant to temporarily replace, a caretaker government does not have a legitimate mandate (electoral approval) to exercise aforementioned functions.

Definition 
Caretaker governments may be put in place when a government in a parliamentary system is defeated in a motion of no confidence, or in the case when the house to which the government is responsible is dissolved, to be in place for an interim period until an election is held and a new government is formed. In this sense, in some countries which use a Westminster system of government, the caretaker government is simply the incumbent government, which continues to operate in the interim period between the normal dissolution of parliament for the purpose of holding an election and the formation of a new government after the election results are known. Unlike in ordinary times, the caretaker government's activities are limited by custom and convention.

In systems where coalition governments are frequent a caretaker government may be installed temporarily while negotiations to form a new coalition take place. This usually occurs either immediately after an election in which there is no clear victor or if one coalition government collapses and a new one must be negotiated. Caretaker governments are expected to handle daily issues and prepare budgets for discussion, but are not expected to produce a government platform or introduce controversial bills.

A caretaker government is often set up following a war until stable democratic rule can be restored, or installed, in which case it is often referred to as a provisional government.

Caretaker governments associated with elections
Many countries are administered by a caretaker government during election periods, such as:
Caretaker government of Australia
Caretaker government of Bangladesh
Demissionary cabinet, a Dutch caretaker cabinet.
Other countries that use similar mechanisms include Canada, Pakistan and New Zealand.

Caretaker governments associated with wars or new regimes

 Iraq is governed by a caretaker government.

Caretakers

Heads of caretaker governments are often referred to as a "caretaker" head, for example "caretaker prime minister".

Similarly, but chiefly in the United States, caretakers are individuals who fill seats in government temporarily without ambitions to continue to hold office on their own. This is particularly true with regard to United States senators who are appointed to office by the governor of their state following a vacancy created by the death or resignation of a sitting senator.  Sometimes governors wish to run for the seat themselves in the next election but do not want to be accused of unfairness by arranging their own appointments in the interim. Also, sometimes they do not wish to be seen as taking sides within a group of party factions or prejudicing of a primary election by picking someone who is apt to become an active candidate for the position. At one time, widows of politicians were often selected as caretakers to succeed their late husbands; this custom is rarely exercised today, as it could be viewed by some as nepotism.

In Canada and most other English-speaking countries, the more widely accepted term in this context is interim, as in interim leader. In Italy, this kind of premier is the President of Government of Experts.

List of caretaker individuals
The following is a list of individuals who have been considered caretaker (or provisional or interim) heads of state or heads of government:

Heads of state
 Pehr Evind Svinhufvud, Regent of Finland in 1917–1918
 Carl Gustaf Emil Mannerheim, Regent of Finland in 1918–1919
 José Linhares (Brazil, October 1945 – January 1946)
 Pascoal Ranieri Mazzilli (Brazil, August – September 1961)
 Win Maung (Burma/Myanmar, 1962)
 Varahagiri Venkatagiri (India) (only first term, May – July 1969)
 Mohammad Hidayatullah (India, July – August 1969)
 Alain Poher (France, especially second term, April – May 1974)
 Basappa Danappa Jatti (India, February – July 1977)
 Émile Jonassaint (Haiti, June 1993 – October 1994)
 Wasim Sajjad (Pakistan, December 1997 – January 1998)
 Eduardo Duhalde (Argentina, January 2002 – May 2003)
 Eduardo Rodríguez (Bolivia, June 2005 – January 2006)
 Muhammad Mian Soomro (Pakistan, August 2008 – September 2009)
 Kgalema Motlanthe (South Africa, September 2008 – May 2009)
 Bronisław Komorowski (Poland) (only first term, April – July 2010)
 Jens Böhrnsen (Germany, 31 Mai – June 2010)
 Horst Seehofer (Germany, February – March 2012)
 Alejandro Maldonado Aguirre (Guatemala, September 2015 – January 2016)
 Richard Wagner (Canada, January - July 2021)

Heads of government

19th century and earlier 
 Arthur Wellesley, 1st Duke of Wellington (United Kingdom, second term, Nov – Dec 1834)

20th century 
 Jorge B. Vargas (as Chairman of the Philippine Executive Commission, 1942 – 43)
 Winston Churchill (United Kingdom, May  –  July 1945)
 Vincent Auriol (France, Nov – Dec 1946)
 General Ne Win (Burma/Myanmar, 1962)
 Gulzarilal Nanda (India, 1964 and 1966)
 Walter Scheel (West Germany, May 1974)
 Malcolm Fraser (Australia, first term only, 1975)
 Mehdi Bazargan (Iran, 1979)
 Mohammad-Reza Mahdavi Kani (Iran, Sep – Oct 1981)
 Ghulam Mustafa Jatoi (Pakistan, Aug – Nov 1990)
 Waldemar Pawlak (Poland, first term, 1992)
 Moeenuddin Ahmad Qureshi (Pakistan, Jul – Oct 1993)
 Balakh Sher Mazari (Pakistan, Apr – May 1993)
 Jean Kambanda (Rwanda, April – July 1994)
Jozef Moravčík (Slovakia, March – Dec 1994)
Malik Meraj Khalid (Pakistan, Nov 1996 – Feb 1997)
 Hashim Thaçi (Kosovo, first term, 1999–2000)

21st century 
 Muhammad Mian Soomro (Pakistan, Nov 2007 – March 2008)
 Madhav Kumar Nepal (Nepal, 2009–2010)
 Yves Leterme (Belgium, 2009–2011)
 Marin Raykov, Bulgaria (March–May 2013)
 Mir Hazar Khan Khoso (Pakistan, March – Jun 2013)
 Vassiliki Thanou-Christophilou (Greece, Aug – Sep 2015)
 Caretaker Cabinet of Vassiliki Thanou-Christophilou
 Enda Kenny (Ireland, 2016)
 Mariano Rajoy (Spain, 2015 – 16)
 Emil Dimitriev (North Macedonia, 2016–17)
 Angela Merkel (Germany, third term, Oct 2017–March 2018)
 Nasirul Mulk (Pakistan, Jun – Aug 2018)
 Mahathir Mohamad (Malaysia, February 2020)
Leo Varadkar (Ireland, 2020)
 Min Aung Hlaing (Myanmar, since February 2021)
 Stefan Löfven (Sweden, 2021)
 Stefan Yanev, Bulgaria (May – Dec 2021)
 Muhyiddin Yassin (Malaysia, August 2021)                                                      
 Erna Solberg (Norway, Sep – Oct 2021)
 Angela Merkel (Germany, fourth term, Oct – Dec 2021)
 Yair Lapid (Israel, 2022)
 Mario Draghi (Italy, Draghi Cabinet, 2022)
 Ismail Sabri Yaakob (Malaysia, 2022 Malaysian general election)
 Eduard Heger (Slovakia, Heger's_Cabinet, May 2021 - Dec 2022)

See also
 Acting (law), in law, a person acting in a position temporarily, not serving in the position on a permanent basis
 Caretaker ministry (disambiguation), in British politics
 Demissionary cabinet, in Dutch politics
 Lame duck (politics)
 Provisional government
 Rump cabinet, in Dutch politics

References

Government
Political terminology
Caretaker governments